Katchukattu is a village in the Kumbakonam taluk of Thanjavur district, Tamil Nadu, India.

Demographics 

As per the 2001 census, Katchukattu had a total population of 931 with 458 males and 473 females. The sex ratio was 1033. The literacy rate was 72.72

References 

 

Villages in Thanjavur district